Nicolas Pesce is an American filmmaker. He is best known for directing and writing the horror films The Eyes of My Mother (2016), Piercing (2018) and The Grudge (2020).

Life and career
Nicolas Pesce was born, and currently resides, in New York City. His theatrical debut, The Eyes of My Mother, premiered in the NEXT section at the 2016 Sundance Film Festival on January 22, 2016. Pesce's next feature film, Piercing then premiered at the 2018 Sundance Film Festival on January 20, 2018. Pesce's third feature film, The Grudge, the fourth installment in the American The Grudge series was released on January 3, 2020. In January 2023, Pesce's latest film, Visitation was in production with Olivia Cooke and Isla Johnston both starring in the film.

Filmography

Films

Short films

Television series

References

External links 
 

Living people
Film directors from New York City
Horror film directors
Year of birth missing (living people)